The William Mowry House is an historic farm house on Farnum Pike in North Smithfield, Rhode Island.  It is a -story plank-framed house, five bays wide, with a gable roof and a large central chimney.  The main entrance is centered on the main (south-facing) entry, and is enclosed within a single-story hip-roof vestibule of 20th-century construction.  A small single-story ell extends to the west of the main block.  The interior follows a typical center-chimney plan, with the kitchen and parlor in the front of the house, and the dining room flanked by a small pantry and bathroom in the rear.  The house was built c. 1802-05 by William Mowry, whose family has owned land in the area since the 17th century.

The house was listed on the National Register of Historic Places in 1983.

See also
National Register of Historic Places listings in Providence County, Rhode Island

References

Houses on the National Register of Historic Places in Rhode Island
Houses completed in 1805
Houses in Providence County, Rhode Island
Federal architecture in Rhode Island
North Smithfield, Rhode Island
1805 establishments in Rhode Island
National Register of Historic Places in Providence County, Rhode Island